Waterden medieval settlement is a deserted medieval village in Norfolk, England, about  west of Walsingham. It is a Scheduled Monument.

History
Waterden is recorded in the Domesday Book of 1086 as a small settlement, and is mentioned in Nomina Villarum of 1316. The subsidy roll of 1332 recorded 24 people contributing to the lay subsidy. The Black Death of 1349 evidently had no significant effect, since it was not awarded tax relief in the 1350s.

In 1449 the lay subsidy was reduced more than for the neighbouring settlements; by the early 16th century Waterden was not regarded as a separate village for taxation purposes. By the early 18th century the area of the settlement had been enclosed.

A hall was built in the 16th century, and is shown on a map of 1714. It was demolished in 1781.

Earthworks
The main street (shown on the map of 1714) of the medieval village runs north-east to south-west along the bottom of a shallow valley. Part of this is now a modern trackway with a channeled stream alongside. North of this and east of the main street are a row of five rectangular homesteads and indication of a back lane beyond; west of the main street is indication of a large enclosure, in which the 16th-century hall was situated, and three small enclosure to the north-east.

There are enclosures between the trackways. West of the green, there is a chain of later ponds; west of these, parts of three homesteads can be discerned. The remaining traces of these, in an adjoining field, have been lost by ploughing, but have been recorded by aerial photography.

See also
 List of lost settlements in Norfolk
 Egmere medieval settlement, a neighbouring site to the north-east

References

Deserted medieval villages in Norfolk
Scheduled monuments in Norfolk